"Spinout" is a song first recorded by Elvis Presley as part of the soundtrack for his 1966 motion picture Spinout. In 1966 it was released on a single with "All That I Am", another song from the same movie, on the opposite side. It peaked at number 40 on the Billboard Hot 100 but would continue to sell over 400,000 copies. ("All That I Am" also charted, peaking at number 41.)

Critical reception 
John Floyd, the author of the book Sun Records: An Oral History, considers "Spinout" a great song, naming it along other great songs from "Presley's seriously underrated sixties and seventies work": "Can't Help Falling in Love", "You Don't Know Me", "Long Black Limousine", "Suspicious Minds", and "I Can Help".

Charts

References

External links 
 Elvis* - Spinout / All That I Am at Discogs

1966 songs
1966 singles
Elvis Presley songs
RCA Records singles
Songs with music by Ben Weisman
Songs written by Dolores Fuller
Songs written by Sid Wayne
Songs written for films